Salavat Rural District is in Moradlu District of Meshgin Shahr County, Ardabil province, Iran. At the census of 2006, its population was 2,516 in 544 households; there were 1,946 inhabitants in 499 households at the following census of 2011; and in the most recent census of 2016, the population of the rural district was 1,785 in 509 households. The largest of its 18 villages was Salavat, with 694 people.

References 

Meshgin Shahr County

Rural Districts of Ardabil Province

Populated places in Ardabil Province

Populated places in Meshgin Shahr County